The 2021 Star Nursery 150 was a ARCA Menards Series West race held on September 23, 2021. It was contested over 150 laps on the  short track oval. It was the seventh race of the 2021 ARCA Menards Series West season. David Gilliland Racing driver Taylor Gray, collected his second win of the season.

Background

Entry list 

 (R) denotes rookie driver.
 (i) denotes driver who is ineligible for series driver points.

Practice/Qualifying 
Practice and qualifying were combined into 1 75-minute session, where the fastest lap counted as the driver's qualifying lap.

Starting Lineups

Race

Race results

References 

2021 in sports in Nevada
Star Nursery 150
2021 ARCA Menards Series West